Illuminate Adelaide is an annual winter event held each July in Adelaide, South Australia. It includes free and ticketed events presented by local, national and international artists and companies, encompassing "art, light, sound and imagination".

The first event was announced by the Government of South Australia in August 2020, planned for July in the following year and intended to showcase various types of light shows, along with art installations, immersive technology, music, performance arts, and to present ideas for public debate. The co-founders and creative directors were Rachael Azzopardi and Lee Cumberlidge. The 2021 event took place over 17 nights in July, although some events were also presented during the day, and were extended for longer; one exhibition, Van Gogh Alive the Experience, ran until mid-September. In 2021, the Adelaide Festival of Ideas was incorporated within Illuminate Adelaide, taking place over three days at the University of Adelaide.

The 2022 event takes place throughout the whole month of July. It includes the return of Light Creatures, a popular event in 2021, when Adelaide Zoo opened at night for the first time. City Lights comprises over 40 light-based installations across Adelaide city centre, and there will be an artwork by  Archibald Prize-winning artist Vincent Namatjira, projected onto the facade of the Art Gallery of South Australia. Musical productions include a performance by UK band Gorillaz, Poland's Unsound Festival of experimental and electronic music, and shows by local musicians Mindy Meng Wang, master of the Chinese zither or guzheng, and Tim Shiel, who composes and plays electronic music. The event will take place in laneways, street fronts and open spaces, split into North, East and West precincts. Istanbul-based Ouchhh Studio is the festival's 2022 "Luminary Artist in Residence".

The event is supported by the state government through the South Australian Tourism Commission.

References

External links 

Ideas
2021 establishments in Australia
Festivals established in 2021